Khialdas Fani (4 April 1914 - 8 April 1995) was an Indian writer, poet, stage artist and singer who wrote in Sindhi. He also served as vice-chairman of the Madhya Pradesh Sindhi Sahitya Academy.

Biography 
Khialdas was born on 4 April 1914 at Mian Jo Goth, near Shikarpur, Sindh (now in Pakistan). His father's name was Valiram Begwani. He went to school in the village and then gained further education in Shikarpur. 

In India, he served as professor at Bhopal College and retired in 1973. Recognizing his service for education and literature, the Bhopal Government appointed him as a lifetime principal of the college. In Bhopal, Fani served as convener of the textbook committee, vice-president of the Provincial Academy, and member of the Central Literary Academy. He also served as chairman of the Bhopal Kalamandal (theater/stage drama) for 35 years. He was also an approved PhD supervisor of the Bombay University.

Literary contributions 
At the time of his birth, Shikarpur was a center of literary activities and gatherings. Many noted poets including Agha Ghulam Nabi Sufi, Faqir Ghulam Ali Masroor, Lutufullah Jogi and Saz Ali Saz used to participate in those gatherings. The young Fani was greatly inspired by the poetry of Agha Ghulam Nabi Sufi. He started composing poems under the guidance of Agha Ghulam Nabi Sufi. Perhaps, it was the year 1929, when Fani presented his first poem in a literary gathering in Shikarpur.

Fani is considered as one of the best Sindhi language poets of Sindh and India. He composed poetry in different forms, namely, Geet, Kafi, Baita, Panjkira, Ghazal and Rubai etc.  The omnipotence of the Creator, the beauty of nature, tender human emotions and the reality of modern life were themes of his poetry. The poems which he composed after the partition of India reflected his sweet memories of those good old days which he spent at the place of his birth in Sindh. The beauty of Fani's poems lies not only in his deep thought but also in his appropriate choice of words and form. These poems have a particular rhythm which is probably due to the fact that he himself was a good singer and musician.

Books 
Radio Raag (Radio Songs), 1949
Samoondee Laharoon (Waves of Ocean), poetry, 1951
Sik, Soz Ain Saaz (Longing, Grief & Musical Instrument), poetry, 1983
Khizaan-Jee-Khushboo Peela Pann  (Fragrance of Autumn – Yellow Leaves), poetry, 1994
Makti Marag
Pachhtau Ja Gorha
Samund Samayo Boonda Men

Kalakar Mandal 
Fani founded Kalakar Mandal in Bhopal. This was a theater group. Fani produced a number of stage dramas on the platform of this Mandal. He introduced a number of talented young stage actors and actresses. He particularly encouraged Sindhi speaking girls to show their talent. Some of his famous dramas are listed below:

 Qismat Jo Khel
 Wirhasat
 Shal Dheear Na Jaman
 Ahsas Jo Aaeenu
 Karni Bharni

Fani wrote lyrics for the first Sindhi film Ekta which was released in 1942.

Awards and honours 
He received several awards and honors during his career. However he has not left any record behind him except the following award for his poetry collection Sik, Soz Ain Saaz (at New Delhi by Central Hindi Directorate, Govt. of India).

Death 
Khialddas Fani died on 8 April 1995 in India.

References 

1914 births
1995 deaths
20th-century Indian male writers
20th-century Indian poets
Indian male poets
Indian male writers
People from Bhopal
People from Mian Jo Goth
 Sindhi-language poets
Sindhi people
Writers from Bhopal
Writers from Sindh
Pee Dee Cyclones players
People from Shikarpur District
Poets from Madhya Pradesh